Jasmin Annika Krohn, born 22 November 1966 in Gothenburg German Christinae Parish in Gothenburg,  Sweden, is a retired female ice speed skater from Sweden, who represented her native country in three consecutive Winter Olympics, starting in 1988 in Calgary, Alberta, Canada. She mainly competed in the long-distance events.

References

1966 births
Swedish female speed skaters
Speed skaters at the 1988 Winter Olympics
Speed skaters at the 1992 Winter Olympics
Speed skaters at the 1994 Winter Olympics
Olympic speed skaters of Sweden
Sportspeople from Gothenburg
Living people